The 2020 Desert Diamond Casino West Valley 200 was a NASCAR Xfinity Series race held on November 7, 2020. It was contested over 200 laps on the  oval. It was the thirty-third race and final race of the 2020 NASCAR Xfinity Series season. Team Penske driver Austin Cindric collected his sixth win of the season, and clinched the Xfinity Series championship.

Report

Background 
The motorsport track opened in 1964 and currently hosts two NASCAR race weekends annually. PIR has also hosted the IndyCar Series, CART, USAC and the Rolex Sports Car Series. The raceway is currently owned and operated by International Speedway Corporation.

Entry list 

 (R) denotes rookie driver.
 (i) denotes driver who is ineligible for series driver points.

Qualifying 
Justin Allgaier was awarded the pole based on competition based formula.

Qualifying results

Race

Race results

Stage Results 
Stage One
Laps: 45

Stage Two
Laps: 45

Final Stage Results 

Laps: 110

Race statistics 

 Lead changes: 16 among 7 different drivers
 Cautions/Laps: 8 for 47
 Time of race: 2 hours, 13 minutes, and 51 seconds
 Average speed:

References 

2020 in sports in Arizona
Desert Diamond Casino West Valley 200
2020 NASCAR Xfinity Series